Warrington Borough Council elections are held every four years. Warrington Borough Council is the local authority for the unitary authority of Warrington in Cheshire, England. Since the last boundary changes in 2016, 58 councillors have been elected from 22 wards.

Political control
From 1900 to 1974 the town of Warrington was a county borough, independent from any county council, although treated as part of Lancashire for ceremonial purposes. Under the Local Government Act 1972 it had its territory enlarged and became a non-metropolitan district in Cheshire, with Cheshire County Council providing county-level services. The first election to the reconstituted borough council was held in 1973, initially operating as a shadow authority before coming into its powers on 1 April 1974. On 1 April 1998 Warrington became a unitary authority, becoming independent from Cheshire County Council. Political control of Warrington since 1974 has been held by the following parties:

Non-metropolitan district

Unitary authority

Leadership
The leaders of the council since 1985 have been:

Council elections
1973 Warrington Borough Council election
1976 Warrington Borough Council election
1979 Warrington Borough Council election (New ward boundaries)
1983 Warrington Borough Council election
1987 Warrington Borough Council election
1991 Warrington Borough Council election (New ward boundaries)
1995 Warrington Borough Council election (Borough boundary changes took place but the number of seats remained the same)
1997 Warrington Borough Council election (New ward boundaries)
1999 Warrington Borough Council election
2000 Warrington Borough Council election
2001 Warrington Borough Council election
2002 Warrington Borough Council election
2004 Warrington Borough Council election (New ward boundaries reduced the number of seats by 3)
2006 Warrington Borough Council election
2007 Warrington Borough Council election
2008 Warrington Borough Council election
2010 Warrington Borough Council election
2011 Warrington Borough Council election
2012 Warrington Borough Council election
2014 Warrington Borough Council election
2015 Warrington Borough Council election
2016 Warrington Borough Council election (New ward boundaries and change to holding elections every four years)
2021 Warrington Borough Council election (postponed from 2020 due to COVID-19 pandemic)

By-election results

References

External links
Warrington Council

 
Politics of Warrington
Local government in Warrington
Council elections in Cheshire
Unitary authority elections in England